Yevgeni Anatolyevich Yarkov (born 27 May 1973 in Perm) is a former Russian football player.

References

1973 births
Sportspeople from Perm, Russia
Living people
Soviet footballers
FC Tekstilshchik Kamyshin players
Russian footballers
Russian Premier League players
FC Energiya Volzhsky players
FC Amkar Perm players
Association football midfielders
FC Rotor Volgograd players
FC Spartak Nizhny Novgorod players